Hanstedt is a Samtgemeinde ("collective municipality") in the district of Harburg, in Lower Saxony, Germany. Its seat is in the village Hanstedt.

The Samtgemeinde Hanstedt consists of the following municipalities:

 Asendorf 
 Brackel
 Egestorf 
 Hanstedt
 Marxen 
 Undeloh

Samtgemeinden in Lower Saxony